In mathematical finite group theory, an exceptional character of a group is a character related in a certain way to a character of a subgroup.

Definition

Suppose that H is a subgroup of a finite group G, and C1, ..., Cr are some conjugacy classes of H, and 
φ1, ..., φs are some irreducible characters of H.
Suppose also that they satisfy the following conditions:
s ≥ 2
φi = φj outside the classes C1, ..., Cr
φi vanishes on any element of H that is conjugate in G but not in H to an element of one of the classes C1, ..., Cr
If elements of two classes are conjugate in G then they are conjugate in H
The centralizer in G of any element of one of the classes C1,...,Cr is contained in H
Then G has s irreducible characters s1,...,ss, called exceptional characters, such that the induced characters φi* are given by
φi* = εsi + a(s1 + ... + ss) + Δ
where ε is 1 or −1, a is an integer with a ≥ 0, a + ε ≥ 0, and Δ is a character of G not containing any character si.

Construction

The conditions on H and C1,...,Cr imply that induction is an isometry from generalized characters of H with support on C1,...,Cr to generalized characters of G. In particular if i≠j then (φi − φj)* has norm 2, so is the difference of two characters of G, which are the exceptional characters corresponding to φi and φj.

See also
 Dade isometry
 Coherent set of characters

References

Finite groups
Representation theory